David Jemmali (born 13 December 1974) is a Tunisian former professional footballer who played as a defender. He spent most of his career at FC Girondins de Bordeaux.

In his time at Bordeaux, he won Ligue 1 in the 1998–99 season and the Coupe de la Ligue in 2002 and 2007.

Hoping for a selection to the France national team, he turned down several opportunities to represent Tunisia. However, when the 2006 World Cup was approaching, Jemmali accepted the offer and made his debut for the "Eagles of Carthage" on 1 March 2006 against Serbia and Montenegro. He was subsequently called up to the 2006 World Cup. Jemmali started Tunisia's first game of the 2006 World Cup against Saudi Arabia but did not appear in the other two group matches.

References

External links

1974 births
Living people
Association football defenders
Tunisian footballers
Tunisia international footballers
2006 FIFA World Cup players
French sportspeople of Tunisian descent
AS Cannes players
FC Girondins de Bordeaux players
Grenoble Foot 38 players
Ligue 1 players